A telluride mineral is a mineral that has the telluride anion as a main component.

Tellurides are similar to sulfides and are grouped with them in both the Dana and Strunz mineral classification systems.

Examples include:

 altaite
 calaverite
 coloradoite
 empressite
 hessite
 kostovite
 krennerite
 melonite
 merenskyite
 petzite
 rickardite
 stützite
 sylvanite
 tellurobismuthite
 temagamite
 tetradymite
 vulcanite

See also
 Cripple Creek & Victor Gold Mine

References